John Taufa Lotulelei (born December 4, 1991) is an American football linebacker for the Jousters of The Spring League. He played college football at UNLV. He is also the CEO of a roofing company in Dallas, Texas.

Early years
Lotulelei attended Henry Perrine Baldwin High School. He accepted a football scholarship from UNLV.

Professional career

Seattle Seahawks
Lotulelei was signed as an undrafted free agent by the Seattle Seahawks after the 2013 NFL Draft on April 27.

On October 2, 2013 Lotulelei was released by the Seahawks to make room for quarterback B. J. Daniels. Lotulelei made Seattle’s 53-man roster as an undrafted free agent from UNLV and had played in two games, making three tackles overall. Seattle paid Lotulelei a signing bonus of $25,000 last spring, the highest given to any undrafted free agent, and Lotulelei was an early training camp standout.

Jacksonville Jaguars
On October 3, 2013, Lotulelei was claimed off waivers by the Jacksonville Jaguars. He was waived/injured on August 2, 2014 and was subsequently placed on injured reserve. On August 3, 2014, he was placed on injured reserve. On October 10, 2015, he was waived. On October 12, 2015, he was placed on injured reserve. On October 16, 2015, he was waived from injured reserve.

Oakland Raiders
On November 25, 2015, Lotulelei was signed to the Raiders' practice squad. On December 23, 2015, the Oakland Raiders promoted Lotulelei to the 53 man roster and placed defensive end Mario Edwards Jr. on the Injured Reserve.

On September 3, 2016, Lotulelei was released by the Raiders as part of final roster cuts.

Dallas Cowboys
On January 3, 2017, Lotulelei signed a reserve/future contract with the Dallas Cowboys. He was waived/injured on August 25, 2017 and placed on injured reserve.

San Diego Fleet (AAF)
On November 9, 2018, Lotulelei signed with the San Diego Fleet of the Alliance of American Football (AAF). The league ceased operations in April 2019.

The Spring League
Lotulelei was selected by the Jousters of The Spring League during its player selection draft on October 12, 2020.

Personal life
Lotulelei is the cousin of defensive tackle Star Lotulelei, who was selected in the first round of the 2013 NFL Draft, playing for the Carolina Panthers and Buffalo Bills.

References

External links
UNLV Rebels bio 
Seattle Seahawks bio

1991 births
Living people
Players of American football from Hawaii
American football linebackers
UNLV Rebels football players
Seattle Seahawks players
Jacksonville Jaguars players
Oakland Raiders players
Dallas Cowboys players
San Diego Fleet players
People from Wailuku, Hawaii
American people of Tongan descent
The Spring League players